Museum Replicas Ltd. (MRL) is a wholly owned subsidiary of Atlanta Cutlery Corp. (ACC) designing, replicating, manufacturing, reselling arms, armor and period clothing for men and women. It features swords, daggers, helmets, suits of armor, accessories, costumes and home accents with the historical themes of Greek, Roman, Viking, Medieval, Renaissance and the industrial niche of steampunk. MRL has supplied sets as well as acquired licensing rights for prop replicas and costumes for movies such as Star Wars, The Lord of the Rings, Harry Potter, Gladiator and Braveheart. MRL products are sold retail and wholesale in approved territories globally. MRL is also part of the Windlass Group. It has its manufacturing facilities at Dehradun in India, Conyers, Georgia and Atlanta, Georgia in the US and Toledo in Spain.

History

In 1985, Mr. Hank Reinhardt (American author, noted armorer and medieval weaponry authority) came together with Atlanta Cutlery Corp (ACC) founder Bill Adams to expand ACC knife offerings to affordable medieval swords and related historical weapons, armor and accessories. On a trip to Europe they discovered the Del Tin brothers in Italy producing exactly what they needed- historically researched and accurate swords, hand forged like the originals at a price that brought these into the realm of the affordable. Over the next decade MRL focused on historical edged weapons like daggers, maces, axes, pole arms, helmets, armor, shields and period clothing. The firm produced quality replicas, many made and tested by Reinhardt himself. In 1995 ACC founder Bill Adams eventually retired and the company was sold to its primary supplier of parts and blades - Windlass Steelcrafts - the largest sword maker in the world.

Over the next two decades MRL established business partnerships with Studio Canal SA, Paramount, Warner Bros., Universal, 20th Century Fox, Disney, HBO, Starz, Lucasfilm, Sony, Marvel, DC, Gaming companies like Blizzard Entertainment, Ubisoft and popular authors like Robert Jorden, RR Martin and Brent Weeks. This foray into entertainment was a key catalyst for the widest selection of products made in the company's 30-year history.

In 2011, Atlanta Cutlery Corp, acquired Marto, a leading European company in Toledo, Spain that manufactures decorative historical swords.

Products

MRL creates mostly original and some licensed consumer line products for companies and individuals. Some of its significant licensed works are life size replicas and/or props from movies, TV, books and more.  

A list of products include historical collectibles:

• Hand-Forged Swords, Knives & Daggers

• Helmets, Armor & Shields

• Women's Costumes & Accessories

• Men's Costumes & Accessories

• Children's Costumes & Toys

• Jewelry

• Home Décor & Accessories

The MRL staff includes experts from the fields of metallurgy, forging, research and the accurate and practical use of historical items from swords and armor to clothing. Museums are a primary source for inspiration and research.

References

External links
 Museum Replicas Limited—official site
 Atlanta Cutlery Corp - Atlanta Cutlery Corp.
 Costumes and Collectibles - Period and Themed Costumes, Accessories and Collectibles
 Windlass Steelcrafts - Windlass Steelcrafts official website
 Museum Replicas Facebook - Museum Replicas Official Facebook Page 
 Museum Replicas UK - Museum Replicas UK 
 Marto - Official website of Marto, Toledo
YouTube Channel - Official YouTube channel of Museum Replicas Ltd

Knife manufacturing companies
Swordsmiths